Venizelos Pentarakis (born 15 July 2000) is a Greek professional footballer who plays as a goalkeeper for Super League 2 club Chania.

References

2000 births
Living people
Greek footballers
Football League (Greece) players
Super League Greece 2 players
Platanias F.C. players
Association football goalkeepers
Footballers from Chania